Fitness culture is a sociocultural phenomenon surrounding exercise and physical fitness. It is usually associated with gym culture, as doing physical exercises in locations such as gyms, wellness centres and health clubs is a popular activity. An international survey found that more than 27% of world total adult population attends fitness centres, and that 61% of regular exercisers are currently doing "gym-type" activities. Getting and maintaining physical fitness has been shown to benefit individuals' inner and outer health. Fitness culture has become highly promoted through modern technology and from the rising popularity of social media platforms.

Development

Gymnastics of ancient Greece and Rome 
The word gymnastics is derived from the Greek word gymnazein which literally means "to exercise naked". In ancient Greece and Rome, a public place devoted to athletes training, called gymnasion (plural: gymnasia) for Greeks and palaestra (plural: palaestrae) for Romans existed in cities. Fitness was regarded as a concept shaped by two cultural codes: rationalization and asceticism; authenticity and hedonism, respectively. In Greece, gymnastic excellence was regarded as a noble and godly pursuit, and was included in a complete education. Gymnasiums became the center of the community, being associated with the arts, the study of logic, and a source of entertainment. Skilled athletes attained an elevated status and devoted their lives to becoming proficient in exercise. Both men and women participated in various gymnastic exercises.  The series of activities include swimming, throwing, wrestling, jumping and weightlifting. After the Romans conquered Greece they developed the activities into a more formal sport and used their gymnasiums to prepare their legions for warfare. However, with the decline of the Roman empire people lost their interest in gymnastics and it now is only known as a form of entertainment.

Nineteenth century 
From around 1800, gymnastics developed in Western countries was meant to enhance body in order to sustain public morals and to mold better citizens. Pehr Henrik Ling was a pioneer in the teaching of physical education in Sweden, and he sought to reform and improve the gymnastics of the ancient Greeks. In 1850, the Supreme Medical Board of Russia reported to their emperor on Ling's system, that by improving one's overall fitness, an athlete became superior to those who merely focused on a subset of muscles or actions. In the mid 19th century the world saw the rise of physical culture, a movement that emphasized the importance of physical exercise for men, women, and children alike. Diocletian Lewis, a physician, even advocated for males and females exercising together in the gym. In 1896  Men's gymnastics was on the schedule of the first modern Olympics. The Olympic gymnastic competition for women began in 1928.

World War II 
Leading up to and during World War II, totalitarian regimes used gymnastics as a way to promote their ideologies. Physical fitness was at the core of Nazi philosophy, and the German government financed the construction of sports and wellness facilities. In 1922, the Nazi Party established the Hitler Youth, where children and adolescents participated in physical activities to develop both their physical and mental fitness. Nazi sports imagery served the purpose of promoting the idea of "Aryan" racial superiority, and in 1933, an "Aryans only" policy was instituted in all German athletic organizations.

In the Soviet Union, the Leninist Young Communist League created the Ready for Labour and Defence of the USSR in 1931, which was a fitness program that was designed to improve public health and prepare the population for highly productive work and the defense of "the motherland".

The Cold War 
During the Cold War, a focus on physical fitness emerged in both the United States and the Soviet Union. Senator Hubert Humphrey gravely warned that communist dominance came from superior sports and fitness programs. His remarks reflected the growing American paranoia of communism. In response, leaders of the military, civilian government, and private sector began crafting a "cult and ritual of toughness". President John F. Kennedy issued a call to the nation urging Americans to prioritize their physical fitness across the country. Fitness was clearly described as a "matter of achieving an optimum state of well-being" that required exercise from both young and old. This focus on fitness also opened the doors for female athletes in both the U.S. and the USSR to become more prominent as contenders in the Olympics.

Mass participation, commercialization 
After World War II, a new form of non-organized, individualistic, health-oriented physical and recreational activities such as jogging began to prevail. The Royal Canadian Air Force Exercise Plans, developed by Dr Bill Orban in 1961, sold 23 million copies to the public. United States Air Force Colonel Kenneth Cooper's book Aerobics was released in 1968 and the mass-market version The New Aerobics in 1979. These publications by Orban and Cooper helped to launch modern fitness culture. The Olympics inspired a running boom in the 1970s. After the release of Jane Fonda's Workout exercise videos in 1982, aerobics became a popular form of group gymnastic activity.

Fitness began to be commercialised. Gyms were set up with the goals not to improve public health but to stimulate and exploit the desire of people to keep fit, have fun and improve themselves. It can also be observed in today's gyms where bodybuilders are trying to reach their aesthetic ideas, through muscle development, using weights and other equipment. Growth in bodybuilding as a fitness phenomenon followed the movie and book Pumping Iron in 1977 and the movie Pumping Iron II in 1985.

The term gym is often associated with the term fitness and going to gyms means doing exercises in fitness institutions such as fitness centres, health clubs or gym clubs where people have to pay for membership in order to use fitness equipment and participate in group fitness activities with instructors, such as aerobics and yoga classes.

Technology, specialization, branding 
Advances in technology in the twenty-first century have changed the way of doing fitness activities. The Quantified Self has become a new phenomenon, where people use technological devices to support their workouts. It is characterized by the use of gadgets such as pedometer, GPS, heart rate monitor and smartphone apps to quantify or monitor the exerciser's efforts.

There is a decrease in popularity of "pure aerobics" exercises. The attention is moving from aerobics, bodybuilding and traditional technique of exercises, to activities such as yoga, zumba, pilates, spinning and aquacycling, tai chi, kickboxing, and outdoor fitness.

Exercises have been commercialized as branded exercises by fitness institutions. Branded exercises are group workouts developed by fitness institutions for people with different goals of fitness.

Influences

Mass media 
Mass media plays an important role in shaping fitness culture because of the messages of an ideal body image they convey. Media such as TV, magazines and book publications, tend to promote slimness or even thinness as the ideal standards of female body image and slenderness or muscularity as the ideal male body image. Commercial advertisements have also created an influential and powerful force in promoting a stereotype of ideal body image which is not limited to fashion advertisements. Advertisements on commodities such as watches, smartphones and household appliances, have promoted an idealized body image of women and men as well. The perception of being slim and thin for women and slender and muscular for men became a stereotype in society, creating sociocultural pressures and influencing people to engage in fitness in order to pursue the ideal body image promoted by the mass media.

Exercising and dieting is often seen as the best way to achieve such ideal body image. For instance, fitness publications promote an idea that doing physical exercise is the natural medicine to your body and health. On the other hand, fashion magazines promote slimness and thinness as the ideal female image: to promote high fashion, models are usually slim and thin. There is also a significant increase of diet and weight loss articles in magazines. In addition, the shape of models has changed dramatically towards a “more tubular female form” in high fashion culture, often sparking controversies.

Peer influence 
People who regularly attend fitness institutions tend to make friends at these locations. They want to feel part of a group, which can be referred to community feeling, as the behaviour of group membership is transmitted from member to member within a group. However, this kind of friendship usually remains restricted within the fitness institution. Besides, the atmosphere in fitness institutions created by people with the same goal becomes a force of motivation. When people go to fitness institutions or start a new activity, they can be encouraged by others and give support to each other.

In addition, fitness institutions can function as dating agencies, creating chances to meet people apart from workplaces. Music, body movement and costumes of people exercising, can easily draw attention and become an occasion to engage with each other.

Another important aspect of fitness culture is the gender differentiation in exercises performed. One study showed that women prefer to do cardiovascular exercise over weight training because it allows them to gain strength without transgressing norms for feminine physical appearance, whereas men prefer other exercises like bodybuilding or boxing in order to be more muscular.

Personal trainers 

Fitness institutions are places where people can cultivate their individual needs in terms of keeping fit and having fun with other people. They have been developed as a commercial environment since 1980s. The concept beyond this commercial aspect can be explained by the idea of making the best use of time because people must pay for their membership in order to join a fitness institution. Thus, they are considered customers. Fitness institutions are trying to explore the market by providing extra services such as personal trainers, coaches and experts.

Personal trainers act as representative roles that represent the fitness club. It is a kind of representation for customers in term of satisfaction and loyalty to that particular fitness institution. Trainers also act as brokers, or agents, to create a link between the activities of their customers and the purchase of extra goods and services that their customers need for particular activities such as shoes for specific training, clothing, or home equipment. Trainers are also motivators of the goods and services. They are required to have technical skills in order to provide professional fitness services to their customers and they need to have good communication skills meant to persuade their customers to do more in the fitness institution, which in turn means purchasing more goods and services. Finally, personal trainers also act as entrepreneurs:  creating a large network of customers for different goods and services in order to produce profits. From this point of view, personal trainers are intermediaries between customers and the fitness institution, playing a crucial role in the commercialization of fitness culture.

The popularity of personal trainers can be explained by the analysis of rule-governed behaviour in terms of evolutionary thinking. From this perspective, personal trainers act as speaker to give rules, while trainees are listeners to follow the rules. Much human behaviour starts out from rule-governed behaviour and switches to long-term control. Whether the trainees will continue the training depends on the reinforcement by following the rule of personal trainers, because being fit and bodily well-being is a long-term contingency of fitness activities.

The role of personal trainers has also revealed a phenomenon which can be explained from the sociological perspective of "outsourced-self". This means “transferring our own responsibility to other”. Keeping healthy and well are people's own responsibility, however people are hiring personal trainers to be responsible for it. It is also relevant to the perspective of "body work" in the sociology of body: people are outsourcing their own bodies to the paid workers in order to keep healthy and prevent illness.

Fitness fashion 

Fitness fashion is a product created by commercialization of fitness culture. As mentioned above, personal trainers also act as agents to sell different goods and services. An example is the case of Body Training System (BTS). BTS instructors are suggested to change their costume according to the programmes in order to show the differences in character. The aim is to aspire the trainees to purchase the same costume offered by the programmes.

Fitness fashion and athletic footwear has become the fastest growing segment in the apparel market. The athleisure trend frames it not only for sport activities but also as daywear or weekend wear. While classic sport brands continue to expand their market share in the industry, high fashion brands have also joined the competition.

Impacts

Gender
 

On the other hand, 
Society and media emphasize athletic women's physical appearance and sexual attractiveness, through representing them as women first and athletes second. Thus, the feminine athletic ideal consists of an attractive appearance, thin body, and sexual appeal, which is conveyed also through clothing: women sportswear must fit snugly, but, most important must be sheath, exaggerating the female shape. In health/fitness magazines are included four stereotypes for masculinity: physical action, power, stance, and muscles. While for female it included three stereotypes: thin ideal, glistening/"wet" look, and feminine face. Thus, the health-fitness magazines tended to use the masculine and feminine ideals through stereotypes more than fashion magazines. Thus, those who practice health-fitness tended to be less dressed or used close-fitting with the intention to emphasize the appeal.

Social media's fitness culture and its effect on body image 
Social media has impacted society in various ways throughout modern history. In relation to fitness, social media has become one of the most impactful outlets for fitness culture. The influence of social media expands further than any individual  to much larger political, economic, and cultural areas of society. Fitspiration on social media platforms does provide individuals with a sense of community and support, which can be beneficial in encouraging them to exercise, stick to dietary and/or fitness plans, strive to achieve a fit body, and expose them to helpful lifestyle tips.

Fitspiration Fitness related content on social media, such as Facebook or Instagram, does influence peoples' lifestyle, fitness habits, and the way they compare themselves to other people. When women view fitness content, they tend to develop a more negative body image and are quicker to compare their bodies to the ones they are seeing on social media. Men are subject to this as well, however it is less common.

See also 
 20th century women's fitness culture
 Aerobic exercise § History
 Exercise § History
 Exercise trends
 Health club
 History of physical training and fitness
 Physical fitness
 Social influences on fitness behavior
 Sociology of sport 
 Sociology of the body

References

Further reading 
 

Physical exercise
Lifestyles
Subcultures